Silhouette is the fifth studio album by American saxophonist Kenny G. It was released by Arista Records in 1988, and reached number 1 on the Contemporary Jazz Albums chart, number 8 on the Billboard 200, and number 10 on the R&B/Hip-Hop Albums chart.

Track listing 

"Silhouette" (Kenny G) - 5:25
"Tradewinds" (Kenny G) - 4:12
"I'll Be Alright" (Lead vocal: Andre Montague) (Douglas Cooper Getschal/Lyndie White) - 4:08
"Against Doctor's Orders" (Alan Glass/Kenny G/Preston Glass) - 4:44
"Pastel" (Kenny G/Preston Glass/Walter Afanasieff) - 5:44
"We've Saved the Best for Last" (Lead vocal: Smokey Robinson) (Dennis Matkosky/Lou Pardini) - 4:20
"All in One Night" (Kenny G) - 5:19
"Summer Song" (Kenny G) - 4:34
"Let Go" (Kenny G) - 5:49
"Home" (Kenny G) - 4:20

Personnel 
 Kenny G – all other instruments (1, 7, 9), soprano saxophone (1, 5, 6), tenor saxophone (2, 3, 7, 8), Yamaha WX7 (2), wind synth (2), alto saxophone (4, 9, 10), arrangements (4)
 Walter Afanasieff – keyboards (1, 2, 3, 5), synth strings (7), synthesizers (8)
 Robbie Buchanan – keyboards (3)
 Preston Glass – keyboards (4), drums (4), arrangements (4)
 Bill Elliott – keyboards (6, 7)
 Lou Pardini – keyboards (6, 7, 10)
 Ren Klyce – Fairlight CMI programming (7)
 Roger Sause – keyboards (8)
 John Raymond – guitars (2, 4, 5, 8)
 Dann Huff – guitars (3, 6)
 Corrado Rustici – guitars (7)
 Vail Johnson – bass guitar (1, 2, 5), fretless bass (2), bass pops (4)
 Joe Plass – bass guitar (8)
 Peter Bunetta – bass drum (1), drums (3, 6)
 Kenny McDougald – drums (2, 5, 8, 9)
 Rick Marotta – drums (7)
 Tony Gable – percussion (2, 7), congas (4) 
 Paulinho da Costa – percussion (4, 5, 9)
 Jeff Pescetto – backing vocals (3)
 Leslie Smith – backing vocals (3, 6)
 Tim Stone – backing vocals (3)
 Patricia Henley – backing vocals (6)
 Ivory Stone – backing vocals (6)

Production 
 Producers – Kenny G (Tracks 1, 2, 4, 5, 7-10); Peter Bunetta and Rick Chudacoff (Tracks 3 & 6); Preston Glass (Track 4).
 Engineers – Steve Smart (Track 1); Gerry Brown (Tracks 1, 2, 5 & 9); Frank Wolf (Tracks 3 & 6); Maureen Droney (Track 4); Darren Klein (Track 6); Dana Jon Chappelle (Track 7); Gordon Lyon (Track 8); Dave Raynor (Track 8); Kenny G (Track 9); Mick Guzauski (Track 10).
 Assistant Engineers – Don Adey (Track 3); Steve Satkowski (Tracks 3 & 6); Bryan Arnett (Track 6); Stuart Hirotsu (Track 7).
 Mixing – Mick Guzauski (Tracks 1, 2, 4, 5, 6, 8, 9 & 10); Frank Wolf (Track 3); Dana Jon Chappelle (Track 7).
 Art Direction and Design – Susan Mendola
 Hand Lettering – Bernie Maisner
 Photography – Rose Shoshana
 Management – Turner Management Group, Inc.

Singles 
Information taken from this source.

Certifications

References 

1988 albums
Arista Records albums
Kenny G albums